Wendy Carol Jacobs (1956–2021) was an American climate lawyer who founded the Harvard Law School Environmental Law and Policy Clinic. She dedicated her career to environmental policy and legal education.

Early life and education 
Jacobs trained at Harvard Law School. Whilst she had initially intended to specialize in international law, she became concerned about the impact of the environment on citizens' health. She was at law school when people living close to the Love Canal were exposed to chemical waste, which gave rise to birth defects and ill health amongst the community. She documented the injustice in the Harvard Law Review. After graduating, Jacobs worked for a law firm in Seattle.

Career 
Jacobs spent most of her career at Foley Hoag, a law firm in Boston. She focused on legal policy to tackle climate change, and worked as a litigator in the Land and Natural Resources Division of the United States Department of Justice. She joined Harvard Law School in 2007, where she established an environmental law clinic. She focused on environmental protection policies and energy law.

Jacobs created the Climate Solutions Living Lab, a research course that developed environmental legislature for American communities. In the wake of Donald Trump's election as president, Jacobs wrote a manual on how to use citizen science data in litigation. The manual outlined best practice and provided information on designing and delivering an environmentally focused climate change project. The manual provides information on the law governing citizen science in different American states. She provided Harvard students with opportunities to defend policies that protect the environment, such as Roderick Bremby's denial of an application for coal-fired power plants.

Jacobs was made Chair of the Clean Air Task Force in 2018.

In 2021, Jacobs fought against Trump's proposed Transparency Rule, a regulation that would have allowed the United States Environmental Protection Agency to require researchers to publish their raw data, meaning that medical information could not inform climate policy.

Selected publications

Personal life 
Jacobs was married in 1985, and had two daughters. She died in 2021.

References 

Harvard Law School alumni
1956 births
2021 deaths
20th-century American lawyers
21st-century American lawyers
Environmental lawyers
20th-century American women lawyers
21st-century American women lawyers